NACHT, LRR and PYD domains-containing protein 2 is a protein that in humans is encoded by the NLRP2 gene.

NALP proteins, such as NALP2, are characterized by an N-terminal pyrin domain (PYD) and are involved in the activation of caspase-1 (CASP1; MIM 147678) by Toll-like receptors(see TLR4). They may also be involved in protein complexes that activate proinflammatory caspases (Tschopp et al., 2003).[supplied by OMIM]

Function 

The NLRP2 gene is one of the family members of nucleotide-binding and leucine-rich repeat receptor (NLR). Information from many literature sources indicates that an N-terminal pyrin effector domain (PYD) is one of the components of the NLRP2 gene. Other components include a centrally-located nucleotide-binding and oligomerization domain (NACHT) and C-terminal leucine-rich repeats (LRR). The products of NLRP2 gene are known to interact with IkB kinase (IKK) complex components. It can also regulate the activities of both caspase-1 and nuclear factor kappa-light-chain-enhancer of activated B cells (NF-kB). The pyrin domain is essential and adequate to suppress the activities of NF-kB (Minkiewicz, de Rivero Vaccari and Keane 1113). An allelic variant (rs147585490) is known to block the NF-kB transcriptional activities. NLRP2 gene is one of the NLR family; it is believed to contribute to the regulation of immune responses (Minkiewicz, de Rivero Vaccari and Keane 1121). Although it is not well understood, the NLRP2 gene is responsible for maintaining fertility in females and contributes to the normal birth. The NPRP2 gene encodes for a human protein known as “NACHT, LRR and PYD domains-containing protein 2”.  NALP2, which is one of the NALP proteins, has an N-terminal pyrin characterization also encoded as MIM 608107 and PYD domain. The NALP2 protein has a role in the activation process of caspase-1, which is encoded as CASP1; MIM 147678. The activation process occurs through the Toll-like receptors. The NALP2 may also take part in protein complexes, which initiates the activation of proinflammatory caspases. NLR family regulates the functioning of the immune system, which technically compromises the normal functions of the body including reproduction.

Discovery 
The NLR gene family where the NLRP2 gene belongs was first extracted from zebrafish, which is a common specimen for the study of immune systems. The NLRP2 gene is believed to have originated from the NLR gene family through mutation. The mutation was initiated by the need for organisms to fit a dynamic environment and diversification in the evolution stages. Also, the mutation of the NLR gene family proteins was also due to the ability of pathogens to subvert the defense mechanism of the host. Therefore, the organisms were forced to device new ways of detecting and counteracting the effects of the resistant pathogens. The evolution of the NLR proteins defines the origin of the NLRP2 gene. The NLRP2 gene is now an innate immune sensor for pathogens and sterile stress signal (SSS) in multi-cellular organisms.

Mutation and infertility 
The deficiency of NLRP2 gene results in the inhibition of the activation of oocytes. The NLRP2 gene is exclusively expressed in oocytes. Therefore, it regulates the quality of the oocytes, which explains its relation to infertility in females.

References

Further reading 

 
 
 
 
 
 
 
 
 
 

LRR proteins
NOD-like receptors